The third edition of the Women's Islamic Games took place in Tehran and Rasht, Iran from 2 to 8 November 2001. A total of 23 countries, 84 teams, and 795 athletes competed at the Games, which featured fifteen separate sports. The competition was due to feature 34 countries but due to the September 11 attacks in the United States, and the War in Afghanistan, the original number was reduced, as was the number of international observers. The competition was overseen by 389 referees and 9 international observers. Hosts Iran won the competition with a total of 185 medals; almost half the medals awarded at the Games.

Participants

Sports

The sports competed at the Games were: badminton, basketball, chess, fencing, futsal, gymnastics, handball, karate, shooting, swimming, table tennis, taekwondo, tennis, and volleyball.

Futsal Results
2001 teams (4): Iran / Azerbaijan / Iraq (national team) + England (Muslim team and not official national team)
Iran 36-0 England Muslim / Iran 17-8 Azerbaijan / Iran W-L Iraq

Day 1 : 5 Aban 1380
Iran 17-8 Azerbaijan
England Muslim 2-4 Iraq

Day 2: 6 Aban 1380
Iran W-L Iraq
Azerbaijan W-L England Muslim

Day 3: 7 Aban 1380
Iran 36-0 England Muslim
Iraq 4-5 Azerbaijan

Final Ranking : 1- Iran 2- Azerbaijan 3- Iraq 4- England Muslim 

Source:
1
2
3
4
5
6 
7

Medal table

Women's Islamic Games, 2001
November 2001 sports events in Asia
Women's Islamic Games
Wom
Multi-sport events in Iran
International sports competitions hosted by Iran
Sport in Tehran
Women's Islamic Games
2000s in Tehran
2001 in women's sport